In vector calculus and differential geometry the generalized Stokes theorem (sometimes with apostrophe as Stokes' theorem or Stokes's theorem), also called the Stokes–Cartan theorem, is a statement about the integration of differential forms on manifolds, which both simplifies and generalizes several theorems from vector calculus.

Stokes' theorem was formulated in its modern form by Élie Cartan in 1945, following earlier work on the generalization of the theorems of vector calculus by Vito Volterra, Édouard Goursat, and Henri Poincaré.

This modern form of Stokes' theorem is a vast generalization of a classical result that Lord Kelvin communicated to George Stokes in a letter dated July 2, 1850. Stokes set the theorem as a question on the 1854 Smith's Prize exam, which led to the result bearing his name.  It was first published by Hermann Hankel in 1861. This classical case relates the surface integral of the curl of a vector field  over a surface (that is, the flux of ) in Euclidean three-space to the line integral of the vector field over the surface boundary (also known as the loop integral).

Introduction 
The second fundamental theorem of calculus states that the integral of a function  over the interval  can be calculated by finding an antiderivative  of :

Stokes' theorem is a vast generalization of this theorem in the following sense. 
In the parlance of differential forms, this is saying that  is the exterior derivative of the 0-form, i.e. function, : in other words, that .
 A closed interval  is a simple example of a one-dimensional manifold with boundary. Integrating  over the interval may be generalized to integrating forms on a higher-dimensional manifold. Two technical conditions are needed: the manifold has to be orientable, and the form has to be compactly supported in order to give a well-defined integral.
 The two points  and  form the boundary of the closed interval. More generally, Stokes' theorem applies to oriented manifolds  with boundary. For example, the natural orientation of the interval gives an orientation of the two boundary points. So, "integrating"  over two boundary points ,  is taking the difference .
In even simpler terms, one can consider the points as boundaries of curves, that is as 0-dimensional boundaries of 1-dimensional manifolds. So, just as one can find the value of an integral over a 1-dimensional manifold by considering the anti-derivative at the 0-dimensional boundaries, one can generalize the fundamental theorem of calculus, with a few additional caveats, to deal with the value of integrals over -dimensional manifolds by considering the antiderivative at the -dimensional boundaries of the manifold.

So the fundamental theorem reads:

Formulation for smooth manifolds with boundary
First, suppose that  is compactly supported in the domain of a single, oriented coordinate chart .

This quantity is well-defined; that is, it does not depend on the choice of the coordinate charts, nor the partition of unity.

The generalized Stokes theorem reads:

Here  is the exterior derivative, which is defined using the manifold structure only. (This fact is also an implication of Stokes' theorem, since for a given smooth -dimensional manifold , application of the theorem twice gives  for any -form , which implies that .) The right-hand side of the equation is often used to formulate integral laws; the left-hand side then leads to equivalent differential formulations (see below).

The theorem is often used in situations where  is an embedded oriented submanifold of some bigger manifold, often , on which the form  is defined.

Topological preliminaries; integration over chains

Let  be a smooth manifold. These groups, together with the boundary map, define a chain complex.

On the other hand, the differential forms, with exterior derivative, as the connecting map, form a cochain complex, which defines the de Rham cohomology groups .

Extending by linearity allows one to integrate over chains. In other words, a -form  defines a functional

on the -chains. This gives a homomorphism from de Rham cohomology to singular cohomology. On the level of forms, this means:

exact forms, i.e., have zero integral over cycles, i.e. if the boundaries sum up to the empty set: .

De Rham's theorem shows that this homomorphism is in fact an isomorphism. So the converse to 1 and 2 above hold true. In other words, if  are cycles generating the th homology group, then for any corresponding real numbers, there exist a closed form, such that

and this form is unique up to exact forms.

Stokes' theorem on smooth manifolds can be derived from Stokes' theorem for chains in smooth manifolds, and vice versa.  Formally stated, the latter reads:

Underlying principle 

To simplify these topological arguments, it is worthwhile to examine the underlying principle by considering an example for  dimensions. The essential idea can be understood by the diagram on the left, which shows that, in an oriented tiling of a manifold, the interior paths are traversed in opposite directions; their contributions to the path integral thus cancel each other pairwise. As a consequence, only the contribution from the boundary remains. It thus suffices to prove Stokes' theorem for sufficiently fine tilings (or, equivalently, simplices), which usually is not difficult.

Classical vector analysis example 
Let  be a piecewise smooth Jordan plane curve. The Jordan curve theorem implies that  divides  into two components, a compact one and another that is non-compact.

This classical statement, is a special case of the general formulation after making an identification of vector field with a 1-form and its curl with a two form through

Generalization to rough sets

For example, if the domain of integration is defined as the plane region between two -coordinates and the graphs of two functions, it will often happen that the domain has corners. In such a case, the corner points mean that  is not a smooth manifold with boundary, and so the statement of Stokes' theorem given above does not apply. Nevertheless, it is possible to check that the conclusion of Stokes' theorem is still true. This is because  and its boundary are well-behaved away from a small set of points (a measure zero set).

A version of Stokes' theorem that allows for roughness was proved by Whitney. Whitney remarks that the boundary of a standard domain is the union of a set of zero Hausdorff -measure and a finite or countable union of smooth -manifolds, each of which has the domain on only one side.

The study of measure-theoretic properties of rough sets leads to geometric measure theory. Even more general versions of Stokes' theorem have been proved by Federer and by Harrison.

Special cases
The general form of the Stokes theorem using differential forms is more powerful and easier to use than the special cases. The traditional versions can be formulated using Cartesian coordinates without the machinery of differential geometry, and thus are more accessible. Further, they are older and their names are more familiar as a result. The traditional forms are often considered more convenient by practicing scientists and engineers but the non-naturalness of the traditional formulation becomes apparent when using other coordinate systems, even familiar ones like spherical or cylindrical coordinates. There is potential for confusion in the way names are applied, and the use of dual formulations.

Classical (vector calculus) case

This is a (dualized) (1 + 1)-dimensional case, for a 1-form (dualized because it is a statement about vector fields). This special case is often just referred to as Stokes' theorem in many introductory university vector calculus courses and is used in physics and engineering. It is also sometimes known as the curl theorem.

The classical Stokes' theorem relates the surface integral of the curl of a vector field over a surface  in Euclidean three-space to the line integral of the vector field over its boundary. It is a special case of the general Stokes theorem (with ) once we identify a vector field with a 1-form using the metric on Euclidean 3-space. The curve of the line integral, must have positive orientation, meaning that  points counterclockwise when the surface normal, points toward the viewer.

One consequence of this theorem is that the field lines of a vector field with zero curl cannot be closed contours. The formula can be rewritten as:

Green's theorem

In electromagnetism
Two of the four Maxwell equations involve curls of 3-D vector fields, and their differential and integral forms are related by the special 3-dimensional (vector calculus) case of Stokes' theorem. Caution must be taken to avoid cases with moving boundaries: the partial time derivatives are intended to exclude such cases. If moving boundaries are included, interchange of integration and differentiation introduces terms related to boundary motion not included in the results below (see Differentiation under the integral sign):

The above listed subset of Maxwell's equations are valid for electromagnetic fields expressed in SI units. In other systems of units, such as CGS or Gaussian units, the scaling factors for the terms differ. For example, in Gaussian units, Faraday's law of induction and Ampère's law take the forms:

respectively, where  is the speed of light in vacuum.

Divergence theorem
Likewise, the divergence theorem

is a special case if we identify a vector field with the -form obtained by contracting the vector field with the Euclidean volume form. An application of this is the case  where  is an arbitrary constant vector. Working out the divergence of the product gives

Since this holds for all  we find

Volume integral of gradient of scalar field
Let  be a scalar field. Then

where  is the normal vector to the surface  at a given point.

Proof:
Let  be a vector. Then

Since this holds for any  (in particular, for every basis vector), the result follows.

See also

Chandrasekhar–Wentzel lemma

Footnotes

References

Further reading

External links

 
 Proof of the Divergence Theorem and Stokes' Theorem
 Calculus 3 – Stokes Theorem from lamar.edu – an expository explanation

Differential topology
Differential forms
Duality theories
Integration on manifolds
Theorems in calculus
Theorems in differential geometry